Tsukitani Hatsuko (月谷初子) (1869–1945) was a Japanese ceramics artist. 

She was born in Tokyo, and after studying sculpture, she trained at various kilns. From 1915 (Taishō 4) to 1932 (Shōwa 7), she set up ceramic ateliers in Gokiso and Moriyama in Nagoya. She was also a pioneer of female artists in sculpture and pottery. 

Her work is known as Tsukitani ware (月谷焼).

See also 
 Sada Yacco, contemporary artist who also lived in Nagoya

References

External links 

1869 births
1945 deaths
Culture in Nagoya
History of Nagoya
People from Nagoya
People from Tokyo
Japanese potters
Japanese sculptors